Earle Albert Rafuse (October 16, 1930 – January 17, 1998) was a Canadian politician. He represented the electoral districts of Annapolis East and Annapolis in the Nova Scotia House of Assembly from 1988 to 1998. He was a member of the Nova Scotia Liberal Party.

Rafuse was born in Middleton, Nova Scotia. He was a wholesale food distributor. Rafuse entered provincial politics in the 1988 election, winning the Annapolis East riding. In the 1993 election, he ran in the new riding of Annapolis, and defeated Progressive Conservative cabinet minister Greg Kerr by over 3,600 votes. He died at the age of 67 in 1998.

References

1930 births
1998 deaths
Nova Scotia Liberal Party MLAs
People from Middleton, Nova Scotia